This is a list of records from the South Australian National Football League since its inception in 1877 (previously known as the South Australian Football Association and the South Australian Football League).

Club records

Largest score

Lowest conceded score 
The lowest scores since the modern scoring system was adopted in 1897.

Individual records

Most career goals 

Note: These tallies refer to premiership matches (home-and-away and finals matches) only.

Most goals in a game

Most goals in a season

Most seasons as leading goal-kicker

Most games for each club

Most Magarey Medals

Most club best and fairest awards

Most premierships as player

Most SANFL games coached

See also

List of VFL/AFL records
List of AFL Women's records
List of Tasmanian Football League records
List of WAFL records

References

SANFL records
Australian rules football records and statistics